Crkveni Bok is a village in central Croatia, in the municipality of Sunja, Sisak-Moslavina County. It is located in the Banija region, in the fertile plains on the right bank of the Sava river, to the east of the town of Sunja and some 20 km north-west of village of Jasenovac.

History
The village of Crkveni Bok was established in the late 17th century when Orthodox Serbs from Podkozarje area in Bosnia settled there. The village became a part of the Military Frontier which, at the time, was expanding onto former Ottoman territories such as Lika, Kordun, Banija and lower Slavonia.

During the World War II, the village was a part of the Nazi-puppet state, the Independent State of Croatia. At the time, the Crkveni Bok municipality comprised the villages of Crkveni Bok, Strmen and Ivanjski Bok. Already in early autumn of 1941, the villages' population was subjected to conversion to the Roman Catholic faith.

The three villages, often referred to as the "Banija Triangle", suffered heavy demographic losses with nearly 30% of its population perishing in the World War II.

Culture 
The local branch of the Serb Cultural Society of Prosvjeta was established in the village in 1945. In 1971, after the Croatian Spring, all activities of the SKD Prosvjeta were suspended along with the activities of Matica hrvatska. The cultural association in Crkveni Bok was re-established in 1974 under the new name, KUD “Savski lugovi” Crkveni Bok.

Demographics
According to the 2011 census, the village of Crkveni Bok has 117 inhabitants. This represents 28.82% of its pre-war population.

According to the 1991 census, 95.32% of the village population were ethnic Serbs (387/406).

NOTE: From 1957-1971 includes data for Blinjska Greda settlement. From 1981 census on, Blinjska Greda settlement is reported separately.

Notable natives and residents

References 

Populated places in Sisak-Moslavina County
Serb communities in Croatia